Virgin Islands is an album by the German andean new age band Cusco. It was released originally in 1983 and is currently available from the Prudence label under the title Virgin Island.

This album contains three tracks which later appeared on the 1990 release Water Stories on Higher Octave Music (Sun of Jamaica, Seychelles and Java). The album also contains a track called Alcatraz, but the music is completely different from the track of the same name on Desert Island and Water Stories, and is actually the original mix of the track Bermudas on the following Island Cruise album. Many discographies show this as a 1984 release, but early LP pressings verify the 1983 release year.

Track listing
"Virgin Islands"
"Santo Domingo"
"Easter Islands"
"Bali"
"Philippines"
"Sun of Jamaica"
"Alcatraz" (Virgin Islands track)
"Seychelles"
"Samoa"
"Fiji Islands"
"Java"
"Saipan Islands"

Album credits
Rainer Pietsch – Keyboard
Todd Canedy – drums, percussion
Kristian Schultze – Arranger, keyboard
Gunther Gebauer – Bass guitar 
Paul Vincent – Guitar  
Munich Philharmonic – Orchestra 
Jochen Scheffter – Engineer
Cusco – Main performer
Michael Holm – Arranger, producer, keyboard

1983 albums
Cusco (band) albums